Conoclinium coelestinum, commonly known as blue mistflower, mistflower, wild ageratum, or blue boneset, is a North American species of herbaceous perennial flowering plant in the family Asteraceae. It was formerly classified in the genus Eupatorium, but phylogenetic analyses in the late 20th century research indicated that that genus should be split, and the species was reclassified in Conoclinium.

Description

Each flowerhead consists of about 40-50 disk florets with tiny tubular corollas that have 5 spreading lobes.

Etymology
The genus Conoclinium is from the Greek word for "cone-bed". The specific epithet coelestinum is from the Latin for sky-blue or heavenly.

Distribution and habitat
C. coelestinum is native to eastern and central North America, from Texas to the west, Illinois to the north, the east coast to the east, and Florida to the south. It has been introduced in New York, Michigan, and Ontario. This species prefers moist soils and can be found in wood edges, sandy woodlands and clearings, wet meadows and stream banks.

Ecology
The flowers bloom from July to October and are attractive to bees and butterflies.

Uses
Blue mistflower is often grown as a garden plant, although it does have a tendency to spread and take over a garden. It is recommended for habitat restoration within its native range, especially in wet soils.

References

External links
 
 PlantFiles: Hardy Ageratum, Blue Mistflower Conoclinium coelestinum. Dave's Garden PlantFiles
 

Eupatorieae
Flora of North America
Plants described in 1753
Taxa named by Carl Linnaeus